Giuseppe Manetti (16 November 1761 – 28 August 1817) was a Neoclassic style architect and landscape architect active in Tuscany. The same name is shared by an Italian violinist (1802—1858).

Biography
He was born and died in Florence. He helped design the layout of gardens for villas belonging to the Grand-Dukes of Florence. Among his best known works are two structure in the two-story Parco delle Cascine in Florence, the Palazzina Reale delle Cascine and the ghiacciaia or ice-house. The latter is shaped like a pyramid. He also designed the Corsi Annalena gardens in Oltrarno.

Bibliography
 Biographical entry in Sistema Informativo Unificato per le Soprintendenze Archivistiche (SIUSA)

1761 births
1817 deaths
18th-century Italian architects
19th-century Italian architects
Italian neoclassical architects
Italian landscape architects
Architects from Florence